"We Are Glass" is a song by the British singer Gary Numan. It was released as a single in May 1980 and reached number five on the UK Singles Chart.

The song was Numan’s first release since his 1979 album, The Pleasure Principle, which had been notable in part for its complete absence of guitars. Though the album was a major commercial success, Numan decided that "getting rid of guitars had been a mistake"  and brought them back into the studio for his next project. The recording also featured viola, piano, and a newly expanded array of electronic keyboards, including ARP Pro Soloist and Roland Jupiter-4, to augment the Moog synthesizers of previous releases.

According to the composer, speaking on Australian radio 2SM in 1981, the song was inspired by a comment from a magazine staffer: "Somebody once told me, a man from Omni, said that he thought I'd been put here by ... something ... aliens or something, to carry out a cause ... which I thought was very flattering but a little silly. ... 'We Are Glass' I wrote because of that, y'know, like all pop stars are put here for reasons."

The accompanying music video featured images of clapping hands silhouetted against laser light, as well as numerous slow-motion shots of the singer smashing bodily through glass panels and destroying mirrors and TV sets with sledge hammers. The alleged strong violence of these latter images resulted in the promo being banned from Britain's Top of the Pops.

Originally released on single only, "We Are Glass" reached number 5 in the UK charts in 1980. The B-side was one of Numan's few non-original pieces, the first movement of Erik Satie's "Trois Gymnopedies," in an arrangement that added guitar, bass and synthesizer to the original's solo piano part.

"We Are Glass" has appeared on numerous compilation albums, as well as CD reissues of the 1980 album Telekon. The song is a regular feature of Numan's concerts and is included on many of his live albums. EMF covered the song on the Random tribute album in 1997. It was remixed twice for the 1998 collection The Mix.

Track listing
 "We Are Glass" (Gary Numan) – 4:46
 "Trois Gymnopedies (First Movement)" (Erik Satie) – 2:45

Production credits
Producers
 Gary Numan

Musicians
 Gary Numan: Vocals, Minimoog, Polymoog, ARP Pro Soloist, Roland Jupiter-4, Guitar
 Paul Gardiner: Bass guitar
 Cedric Sharpley: Drums
 Chris Payne: Viola, Piano
 Rrussell Bell: Guitar, ARP Pro Soloist
 Dennis Haines: ARP Pro Soloist, Piano, Yamaha CP-30 
 John Webb: Percussion

Notes

References
 Paul Goodwin (2004). Electric Pioneer: An Armchair Guide To Gary Numan

Gary Numan songs
1980 singles
Songs written by Gary Numan
1980 songs
Beggars Banquet Records singles
Media containing Gymnopedies